George Field (30 September 1871 – 9 June 1942) was an English cricketer. He was educated at Uppingham School and Oxford University.

He was a right handed batsman and often wicket keeper. He played one first-class match for Oxford University Cricket Club in 1893. After university, he played at club level for Liverpool and appeared in two county matches for Shropshire in 1902, scoring a total of 89 runs, with best match score of 42.

See also
 List of Oxford University Cricket Club players

References

External links
 

1871 births
1942 deaths
English cricketers
Oxford University cricketers
Cricketers from Liverpool
Alumni of Trinity College, Oxford